Huawei station, is a station on Line 10 of the Shenzhen Metro. It opened on 18 August 2020. Huawei station is located right next to Huawei Shenzhen Base. In 2018 it was forbidden by the Shenzhen Bureau of Planning and Natural Resources to name stations after corporate entities, however since the plans for the line were already approved in 2016, the name 'Huawei' was still allowed. Upon opening of the stations, it proved a popular spot for people to take pictures with their phones in front of the station sign.

Station layout

Exits

References

Shenzhen Metro stations
Railway stations in Guangdong
Longgang District, Shenzhen
Railway stations in China opened in 2020
Huawei